Heracleides was a physician of ancient Greece who was said to have been the sixteenth in descent from Aesculapius, the son of Hippocrates I, who lived probably in the fifth century BC. He married a woman named Phaeniarete, or, according to others, Praxithea, by whom he had two sons, Sosander and the renowned ancient physician Hippocrates.

Notes

5th-century BC Greek physicians